Behind the Green Door: the Sequel is a 1986 American pornographic film and the sequel to Behind the Green Door. It was produced by the Mitchell brothers and starred Missy Manners. It had a "safe sex" theme as a response to the AIDS crisis. Hence, all sexual contact between performers featured the use of condoms, dental dams and medical exam gloves.

Cast
 Missy Manners ... Gloria
 James Martin ... Barry
 Lulu Reed ... Flight Attendant / Maenad
 Marie ... Flight Attendant / Maenad
 Fallon ... Flight Attendant / Maenad
 Candi ... Flight Attendant / Maenad
 Friday Jones ... Co-pilot / Maenad
 Aubec Kane ... Pilot / Herm 1
 Andrew Young ... Captain / Pan
 Ja Kinncaide ... Trapeze 2
 Lane Ross ... Trapeze 3
 Tony Cargo ... Herm 2
 Brock Roland ... Club / Apartment Doorman
 Squirt ... Club Host
 Claudine Wims ... Waitress
 D.W. Wachnight ... Bartender
 Sharon McNight ... Wanda / Club Singer
 Pepper ... Woman with Dog
 Bobby Mack ... Limo Driver
 Wallace Barry ... Notetaker
 Yank Levine ... Barry's Friend
 Ron James ... Naked Man with Water
 Jeff Larson ... Lorry Driver
 Erica Idol ... Bride / Airport
 Tau Stephenson ... Groom / Airport
 Rita Ricardo ... Lady in Red Gown
 Noel Juar ... Tattooed Lady
 Wednesday Will ... Slow Dancer 1
 Sixten Bjorline ... Slow Dancer 2
 Jackie ... Lady in Leopard Costume
 Susie Bright ... Club Patron
 Lola Carter ... Airline Passenger
 Jane Castellon ... Airline Passenger
 Danny Daniels 
 Rocky Gieger ... Airline Passenger
 Debi Sundahl ... Club Patron
 Jack Wrangler
 Marilyn Chambers ... Gloria Saunders (archive footage, uncredited)

Production
Missy Manners, née Elisa Florez was formerly a United States Senate Page, receptionist for Utah Republican Senator Orrin Hatch, and daughter of the Undersecretary of Education during the administration of George H. W. Bush.

Though Manners was in a relationship with producer Artie Mitchell, she maintains that she auditioned for the lead role in the film, a claim which many who were significantly involved in the project disputed. Her links to Republican party officials were emphasized in publicity for the film in much the same fashion as her predecessor, Marilyn Chambers, having modeled for Ivory Snow.

Reception
Behind the Green Door: The Sequel was a critical and commercial disaster; Jim and Artie Mitchell ended up losing hundreds of thousands of dollars in that venture.

References

External links
 
 
 

1986 films
1980s pornographic films
Interracial pornographic films
American pornographic films
1980s English-language films
1980s American films